Alcaudete de la Jara is a municipality located in the province of Toledo, Castile-La Mancha, Spain.

According to the 2018 census (INE), the municipality had a population of 1703 inhabitants.

References

Municipalities in the Province of Toledo